Rapsommati (also Ραψομμάτης - Rapsommatis) is a village within the municipality of Megalopoli in the western part of Arcadia, Greece.  It is situated on a hill, 1 km southeast of Mallota, 2 km southwest of Palaiochouni, 3 km northwest of Anemodouri and 5 km southeast of Megalopoli. The Moreas Motorway (Corinth - Tripoli - Kalamata) passes north of the village, through the Rapsommati Tunnel.

Historical population

See also
List of settlements in Arcadia

References

External links
History and information about Rapsommati

Megalopolis, Greece
Populated places in Arcadia, Peloponnese